Ehlen may refer to:

E.L. Ehlen Livery and Sale Stable, an historic livery stables in Kentucky

People with the surname
Frederick Ehlen (1851–1934), American baseball player
Leo Ehlen (1953–2016), Dutch football player
Margriet Ehlen (born 1943), Dutch poet, composer, conductor, and educator
Michelle Ehlen (born 1978), American film director, producer, screenwriter, and actress
Nikolaus Ehlen (1886–1965), German pacifist teacher

See also
 Ellen (disambiguation)